The 2016–17 William & Mary Tribe men's basketball team represented the College of William & Mary during the 2016–17 NCAA Division I men's basketball season. The Tribe were coached by 14th-year head coach Tony Shaver. The team played its home games at Kaplan Arena as members of the Colonial Athletic Association. The Tribe finished the season 17–14, 10–8 in CAA play to finish in a tie for fourth place. As the No. 4 seed in the CAA tournament, they defeated Elon in the quarterfinals before losing to UNC Wilmington in the semifinals. The Tribe did not participate in any postseason tournaments.

The season marked the 112th season of the collegiate basketball program at William & Mary.

Previous season
The Tribe finished the 2015–16 season 20–11, 11–7 in CAA play to finish in a three-way tie for third place. They defeated James Madison to advance to the semifinals of the CAA tournament where they lost Hofstra.

Offseason

Departures

Incoming transfers

Under NCAA transfer rules, Milon will have to sit out for the 2016–17 season. Will have three years of remaining eligibility.

Recruiting Class of 2016

Recruiting Class of 2017

Roster

Schedule and results 

|-
!colspan=9 style=| Non-conference regular season

 

|-
!colspan=9 style=| CAA regular season

|-
!colspan=9 style=| CAA Tournament

See also
2016–17 William & Mary Tribe women's basketball team

References

William And Mary
William & Mary Tribe men's basketball seasons
William and Mary Tribe men's basketball
William and Mary